Ningwu–Kelan railway or Ningke railway, is a single-track regional railroad in Shanxi Province of northern China between Ningwu and Kelan Counties. The  Taiyuan Satellite Launch Center in Kelan County, a space rocket and strategic missile launch facility, is located along route. In recent years, the railway has been used to transport growing coal output from northern Shanxi and was electrified in 2008 to increase transport capacity.

Rail connections
Ningwu: Datong–Puzhou railway, Ningwu–Jingle railway

See also

 List of railways in China

References

Railway lines in China
Rail transport in Shanxi